"" ("National Anthem"), also known as "" (Urdu, ; "Thy Sacred Land"), is the national anthem of the Islamic Republic of Pakistan and formerly the Dominion of Pakistan. It was written in Persian by Hafeez Jalandhari in 1952 and the music was composed by Ahmad G. Chagla in 1949, preceding the lyrics. It was broadcast publicly for the first time on Radio Pakistan on 13 August 1954, sung by Jalandhari himself and officially adopted on 16 August 1954 by the Interior Ministry of the Government of Pakistan.

After officially being adopted, it was recorded in the same year by eleven major singers of Pakistan including Ahmad Rushdi, Kaukab Jahan, Rasheeda Begum, Najam Ara, Naseema Shaheen, Zawar Hussain, Akhtar Abbas, Ghulam Dastagir, Anwar Zaheer, and Akhtar Wasi Ali.

History

In early 1948, A. R. Ghani, a Muslim from South Africa's Transvaal, offered two prizes of five thousand rupees each for the poet and composer of a new national anthem for the newly independent state of Pakistan. The prizes were announced through a government press advertisement published in June 1948. In December 1948, the Government of Pakistan established the National Anthem Committee (NAC) with the task of coming up with the composition and lyrics for the official national anthem of Pakistan. The NAC was initially chaired by the Information Secretary, Sheikh Muhammad Ikram, and its members included several politicians, poets and musicians, including Abdur Rab Nishtar, Ahmad G. Chagla and Hafeez Jullundhri. The NAC encountered early difficulties in finding suitable music and lyrics.

When President Sukarno of Indonesia became the first foreign head of state to visit Pakistan on 30 January 1950, there was no Pakistani national anthem to be played. In 1950, the impending state visit of the Shah of Iran added urgency to the matter and resulted in the government of Pakistan asking the NAC to submit a state anthem without further delay. The NAC chairman, then Federal Minister for Education, Fazlur Rahman, asked several poets and composers to write lyrics but none of the submitted works were deemed suitable. The NAC also examined several different tunes and eventually selected the one presented by Ahmed G. Chagla and submitted it for formal approval. On 21 August 1950, the Government of Pakistan adopted Chagla's tune for the national anthem.

The anthem, without lyrics, was performed for the first time for a foreign head of state on the state visit of the Shah of Iran to Pakistan in Karachi on 1 March 1950 by a Pakistan Navy band.

It was later played for Prime Minister Liaquat Ali Khan during his official visit to the United States on 3 May 1950. It was played before the NAC on 10 August 1950. Official recognition to the national anthem, however, was not given until August 1954. The NAC distributed records of the composed tune amongst prominent poets, who responded by writing and submitting several hundred songs for evaluation by the NAC. Eventually, the lyrics written by Hafeez Jullundhri were approved and the new national anthem was broadcast publicly for the first time on Radio Pakistan on 13 August 1954, sung by Hafeez Jullundhri himself. Official approval was announced by the Ministry of Information and Broadcasting on 16 August 1954. The composer, Ahmed G. Chagla, died in 1953, before the new national anthem was officially adopted. In 1955, there was a performance of the national anthem involving 11 major singers of Pakistan, including Ahmad Rushdi, Kaukab Jahan, Rasheeda Begum, Najam Ara, Naseema Shaheen, Zawar Hussain, Akhtar Abbas, Ghulam Dastagir, Anwar Zaheer and Akhtar Wasi Ali.

In 2021, Interior Minister at the time Fawad Chaudhry announced that the Qaumi Tarana will be re-recorded with better quality. The project was completed in 2022 during Shehbaz Sharif’s tenure. 155 singers, 48 musicians and 6 bandmasters participated in the re-recording, it was released on 14 August, 2022.

Music
The "Qaumī Tarānah" is a rendering of a three-stanza composition with a tune based on eastern music but arranged in such a manner that it can be easily played by foreign bands.

The music, composed by the Pakistani musician and composer, Ahmad G. Chagla in 1949, reflects his background in both eastern and western music. Typically twenty-one musical instruments and thirty-eight different tones are used to play the "Qaumī Tarānah", the duration of which is usually around 80 seconds.

Lyrics
The lyrics which are in classical Urdu are written by the Pakistani Urdu-language poet Hafeez Jalandhari in 1952. Each word of the anthem was  carefully picked to make sure it was a valid Urdu word and it cohered with the tune of the anthem. Most words of the anthem have commonality with the Persian language, rendering them mutually intelligible in both Urdu and Persian. No verse in the three stanza lyrics is repeated. The lyrics have heavy Persian poetic vocabulary, and only use one exclusively Urdu word, "kā".

Urdu official

English translation

Milestones

 1947 – The new state of Pakistan came into being on 14 August.
 1949 – Music for the "Qaumī Tarānah" is composed by the Pakistani musical composer, Ahmad G. Chagla (running time: 80 seconds).
 1950 –  anthem, without lyrics, was performed for the first time for a foreign head of state on the state visit of the Shah of Iran to Pakistan in Karachi on 1 March 1950 by a Pakistan Navy band.
 1952 – Verses were written by the Pakistani poet, Hafeez Jullundhri, are selected from amongst 723 entries.
 1954 – Officially adopted as the national anthem and broadcast for the first time on Radio Pakistan on 13 August
 1955 – Sung by 11 famous Pakistani singers including Ahmad Rushdi, Shamim Bano, Kokab Jehan, Rasheeda Begum, Najam Ara, Naseema Shaheen, Zwar Hussain, Akhtar Abbas, Ghulam Dastgir, Anwar Zaheer, and Akhtar Wassi
 1996 – Rendered in electric guitar for the first time by Pakistani rock band Junoon in their album Inqilaab
 2009 – Rendered as an acoustic instrumental for the first time by Pakistani musician Jehangir Aziz Hayat
 2011 – On 14 August, 5,857 people gathered in a stadium in Karachi to sing the "Qaumī Tarānah" and set a new world record for most people gathered to sing a national anthem simultaneously.
 2012 – On 20 October, 70,000 people gathered in a stadium in Lahore to sing the Qaumee Taraanah and set a new world record for most people gathered to sing a national anthem simultaneously, which was certified by Guinness World Records.
 2017 – Coke Studio released a collaborative rendition of "Qaumī Tarānah" on 4 August by the featured artistes, to celebrate the 70 years of Pakistan in the tenth season.
 2022 – The anthem was re-recorded with modern instruments and in a higher quality. It was released on Pakistan’s 75th Independence Day.

See also

 Pakistan Zindabad (anthem)
 Taraanahye Paakistaan
 Dil Dil Paakistaan
 Qaumee Parcam
 Radio Pakistan
 State emblem of Pakistan

Notes

References

External links

 Pak Sar Zameen Shad Bad Lyrics
 Pakistan: "Qaumī Tarānah" – Audio of the national anthem of Pakistan, with information and lyrics (archive link)
 
 National Anthem of Pakistan
 Pakistan National Songs

National anthems
National symbols of Pakistan
Pakistani music
Pakistan national anthems
National anthem compositions in B-flat major
National anthem compositions in C-sharp major